Moca oxystoma is a moth in the family Immidae. It was described by John David Bradley in 1962. It is found on Vanuatu in the South Pacific.

References

Moths described in 1962
Immidae
Moths of Oceania